Debatik Nazmi Curri (born 28 December 1983) is an Albanian professional football coach and former player who is the current assistant manager of Prishtina.

From 2006 to 2015 he was also part of Albania national team, collecting 44 appearances and scoring once. He began his career as a defensive midfielder, but his position was changed to a centre back when he joined the Albania national team in 2006.

Club career

Early career
Curri began his professional career with Prishtina.

Vorskla Poltava
On 1 July 2005, Curri signed with Ukrainian side Vorskla Poltava. He played for many years on the team, together with fellow Albanians, Armend Dallku & Ahmed Januzi.

Genclerbirliği
On 16 May 2010, Curri signed a three-year contract with Turkish Süper Lig side Gençlerbirliği.

Hoverla Uzhhorod
On 23 July 2013 he returned to Ukrainian Premier League by signing a two-years contract with FC Hoverla Uzhhorod.

Sevastopol
After he prematurely ended his contract with FC Hoverla Uzhhorod, where he had a deal until 2015, he returned to Ukrainian Premier League on 18 January 2014, signing with Sevastopol, joining Besart Ibraimi, an Albanian from North Macedonia. After some games as an unused substitute, he made his debut on 29 March 2014 against Karpaty Lviv, playing a full 90 minutes in a match which finished in a goalless draw. For the next fixture match, a week later on 4 April 2014, Curri played another full 90-minutes against his former team for 5 consecutive seasons Vorskla Poltava, which finished in a 1–0 victory. He became a regular starter in the team as he continued by playing  the entire match against Tavriya Simferopol on 17 April 2014, a match that ended in the 0–2 victory.

Tirana
At the beginning of the summer transfers window for 2014, numerous Albanian clubs, such as Flamurtari Vlorë and Tirana showed interest in signing Curri, who was a free agent. Initially, Tirana withdrew due to the financial requests of Curri. However, on 27 July, Tirana agreed terms with Curri to sign with them.

He made it his debut on 24 August 2014, playing the full 90-minutes against Apolonia Fier, in the opening day of 2014–15 season, winning the match 3–0. He scored his first goal on 14 September 2014, to give his team the 2–1 victory by scoring at the end of stoppage time, in the 90+3' minute against Elbasani. On 18 October 2014 Curri scored his second goal for Tirana, scoring against Kukësi, after he noticed the wrong placement of goalkeeper Argjent Halili, and taking a shot from the midfield.

Flamurtari Vlorë
He remained in Albania after his contract with Tirana had expired, as he signed a one-year contract with Flamurtari Vlorë with the option of a further year. On 10 August, during the training session in Slovenia, Curri suffered a bone-breaking in the calf below the knee on the right leg after a collision with Bruno Telushi, thus keeping him sidelined for the next three months.

Prishtina
On 14 June 2016, Curri returned to Kosovo to join his first club Prishtina, signing a one-year contract, taking the vacant squad number 6. He was presented on the same day along with players such as Ahmed Januzi and Armend Dallku, his former international teammates. Curri made his official debut with the club on 13 August in the Kosovan Supercup, where Prishtina beat 1–0 Feronikeli to win the first silverware of the season. He made his league debut on 19 August in the opening league match against Llapi, playing full-90 minutes in a 3–1 home success. He scored his first goal of the season on 24 September against Feronikeli, the lone goal of the match which allowed Prishtina to take the first spot in the league. Five days later he scored another matchwinner, this time against Ferizaj to give Prishtina another three points to extend the league lead. He played 28 matches and scored twice as Prishtina finished runner-up in the championship.

International career

Albania
Curri received the Albanian citizenship on 28 February 2006.  Curri made it his international debut with Albania national team on 22 March 2006 by playing in starting line up under the coach Otto Barić in a goalless draw against Georgia, where he completed the first half and was substituted by Klodian Duro at the half-time. Curri scored his first goal for his national team on 11 October 2006 against Netherlands in the UEFA Euro 2008 qualification finished in the 2–1 loss in where Curri scored in the 64th minute the match closing goal.

In the 2010 FIFA World Cup qualification, under a new coach Arie Haan, Curri was ever-presented, playing every minute of all 10 matches of the Group 1. He formed the duo-centerbacks partnership with Lorik Cana mostly and a few times with his teammate at Vorskla Poltava, Armend Dallku and once with Elvin Beqiri.
Albania was ranked in the 5th place behind of Denmark, Portugal, Sweden, Hungary and only above Malta, by where collected 1 win, 4 draws and 6 goals for, 13 goal against.

In the UEFA Euro 2012 qualifying Curri played just four out of ten matches, all as a starter, in which he was substituted off just once. He mostly wasn't available for selection by the coach Josip Kuže due to injuries. For the 2014 FIFA World Cup qualification Curri was called up to participate in five of the eight matches, in which he had game time just twice, as this time the new Albania coach Gianni De Biasi had created a strongly duo-partnership in defense with Captain of the national team Lorik Cana and Mërgim Mavraj.

Curri was an unused substitute in the opening match of the UEFA Euro 2016 qualifying against Portugal on 7 September 2014. He played as a substitute in the 2nd Group I match against Denmark on 11 October 2014. Curri officially announced his retirement from Albania against Kosovo.

Kosovo
On 21 May 2014 Curri played for his original country's birthplace, Kosovo, a full 90-minutes match against Turkey finished in the 1–6 home loss at the Adem Jashari Olympic Stadium, Mitrovica, Kosovo.

Style of play
Curri is considered a defensive all-rounder, as he can be deployed in any defensive position. Curri's main playing position is as a centre back, but he can also be deployed as right or left-sided full-back and also as a defensive midfielder. He played in that position in his early days with Albania national team before converting into a centre back, forming a partnership with Lorik Cana.

Career statistics

Club

International

International goals
As of match played 16 November 2015. Albania score listed first, score column indicates score after each Curri goal.

Honours

Club
Vorskla Poltava
 Ukrainian Cup: 2008–09
 Ukrainian Super Cup Runner-up: 2009

Prishtina
Kosovar Supercup: 2016

References

External links

1983 births
Living people
Sportspeople from Pristina
Kosovo Albanians
Association football defenders
Association football midfielders
Kosovan footballers
Albanian footballers
Albania international footballers
Kosovo international footballers
Dual internationalists (football)
FC Prishtina players
FC Vorskla Poltava players
Gençlerbirliği S.K. footballers
FC Hoverla Uzhhorod players
FC Sevastopol players
KF Tirana players
Flamurtari Vlorë players
Football Superleague of Kosovo players
Kategoria Superiore players
Ukrainian Premier League players
Süper Lig players
Albanian expatriate footballers
Kosovan expatriate footballers
Expatriate footballers in Ukraine
Expatriate footballers in Turkey
Albanian expatriate sportspeople in Turkey
Albanian expatriate sportspeople in Ukraine
Kosovan expatriate sportspeople in Turkey
Kosovan expatriate sportspeople in Ukraine